Sir Richard Croft, 6th Baronet (9 January 1762 – 13 February 1818) was an English physician to the British Royal Family and was the obstetrician to Princess Charlotte who became famous due to his role in "the triple obstetrical tragedy" of 1817.

Early life and family
Croft was born on 9 January 1762 at Dunster Park, Berkshire, the son of Herbert Croft and Elizabeth Young. He married on 3 November 1789 Margaret Denman, daughter of Dr. Thomas Denman and Elizabeth Brodie and the sister of Thomas Denman, 1st Baron Denman, who became Lord Chief Justice of England and Wales.

They had four children: Thomas Elmsley Croft, who succeeded his father as 7th Baronet; Archer Denman Croft, who succeeded his brother as 8th Baronet; Frances Elizabeth Croft; and the Reverend Richard Croft, rector at Hillingdon, Middlesex, England. Croft's great-grandson was Henry Page Croft, 1st Baron Croft (he being the son of Richard Benyon Croft, J.P., D.L., High Sheriff of Hertfordshire in 1892, of Fanhams Hall, Ware, Hertfordshire, and grandson of Reverend Richard Croft).

Education
Croft began his medical training under Dr Rupert Chawner, an apothecary/surgeon residing at Burton-upon-Trent.  After he completed his training under Dr Chawner, his parents sent him to London to complete his medical education.  He became a pupil of Dr John Hunter; and by recommendation of Dr. Matthew Baillie, (a fellow pupil of Croft's and nephew of Dr Hunter) he boarded and lodged with Dr Denman. Croft was also trained by his father-in-law, Dr Thomas Denman, a preeminent obstetrician in London at the turn of the nineteenth century, whose textbook on childbirth had been first published in 1788. He graduated with his MD from the University of Oxford in 1789. He held the office of Physician to King George III.

Baronetcy 
Croft succeeded to the title of 6th Baronet Croft, of Croft Castle in the County of Herefordshire, on 27 April 1816 upon the death of his brother, Sir Herbert Croft, who had died without male issue.

"The triple obstetrical tragedy"
When Princess Charlotte conceived in February 1817, Croft was chosen to attend her. Following medical dogma, Croft restricted her diet and bled her during the pregnancy.  Her membranes broke 42 weeks after her last period on 3 November 1817. Her bedroom at Claremont was chosen as the labour and delivery room. The first stage of labour lasted 26 hours. At the beginning of the second stage of labour, Croft sent for Dr. John Sims, who arrived seven hours later. The second stage of labour lasted 24 hours. He had correctly diagnosed a transverse lie of the baby during labour; however, forceps were not used as they had fallen into disfavour in the British medical community. A caesarean section at that time would have resulted in the princess's death.  Eventually, Princess Charlotte delivered a stillborn 9-pound male. Five hours later she died, presumably from concealed inner bleeding.

Although the princess's husband, Prince Leopold, and the Prince Regent, her father, sent messages to thank Croft for his care and attention, Croft was distraught over the outcome. The king ordered a necropsy, with the result that Sir Everard Home, 1st Baronet and Sir David Dundas, 1st Baronet, reported that everything had been done for the best.  However, the death of the Princess continued to weigh heavily on Croft, and on 13 February 1818, at age 56, he killed himself with a gun. Near his body a copy of Shakespeare's Love's Labour's Lost was found  open with the passage (Act V, Scene II): "Fair Sir, God save you! Where is the Princess?"

Society portraitist Sir Thomas Lawrence was commissioned by Croft's half-sister to create a posthumous portrait sketch of Croft in his coffin. The haunting result, now at Croft Castle, is often taken for a man sleeping.

Charlotte's pregnancy is known in medical history as "the triple obstetrical tragedy".

Both Croft and his wife are buried at St James's Church, Piccadilly. A memorial to them is found within the church.

References

Further reading
 Shingleton (November–December 2006). "The Tumultuous Marriage of The Prince and The Princess of Wales". ACOG Clinical Review 11: 13–16.
 Shingleton (July–August 2005). "A Famous Triple Death Tragedy". ACOG Clinical Review 10: 14–16.
  The Death of Princess Charlotte, An Obstetric Tragedy, Charles Oberst.

Crainz, Franco (1977) An obstetric tragedy: the case of Her Royal Highness The Princess Charlotte Augusta.

English obstetricians
Baronets in the Baronetage of England
19th-century English medical doctors
18th-century English medical doctors
Suicides by firearm in England
1762 births
Court physicians
1818 deaths
Burials at St James's Church, Piccadilly